Hinton is a town in Caddo County, Oklahoma, United States. The population was 3,196 as of the 2010 census, up from 2,175 in 2000.

Geography
Hinton is located in northeastern Caddo County at  (35.479004, -98.353748), at an elevation .

Hinton Municipal Airport (FAA ID: 2O8) is about 2 miles northeast, and features a 4001 x 60 ft. (1220 x 18 m) paved runway.

Demographics

As of the census of 2000, there were 2,175 people, 575 households, and 412 families residing in the town. There were 667 housing units at an average density of 211.7 per square mile (81.6/km2). The racial makeup of the town was 73.66% White, 13.15% African American, 4.83% Native American, 0.14% Asian, 4.37% from other races, and 3.86% from two or more races. Hispanic or Latino of any race were 8.46% of the population.

There were 575 households, out of which 36.2% had children under the age of 18 living with them, 56.5% were married couples living together, 12.0% had a female householder with no husband present, and 28.3% were non-families. 26.3% of all households were made up of individuals, and 15.1% had someone living alone who was 65 years of age or older. The average household size was 2.50 and the average family size was 3.01.

In the town, the population was spread out, with 18.9% under the age of 18, 11.6% from 18 to 24, 38.6% from 25 to 44, 18.8% from 45 to 64, and 12.1% who were 65 years of age or older. The median age was 35 years. For every 100 females, there were 175.0 males. For every 100 females age 18 and over, there were 197.0 males.

The median income for a household in the town was $29,028, and the median income for a family was $33,239. Males had a median income of $25,455 versus $20,556 for females. The per capita income for the town was $12,105. About 12.2% of families and 16.2% of the population were below the poverty line, including 19.7% of those under age 18 and 16.8% of those age 65 or over.

Tourism
The park is a favorite of rappellers due to the canyon's cliff formations. It also boasts beautiful trees, especially in the fall when the color of the leaves begin to turn. Camping and day picnicking are allowed, and there is a  lake for fishing. Hiking around the canyon is allowed within park limits. The pool is overseen by certified lifeguards, and at least one lifeguard is on duty at all times.

Corrections

Hinton is also the site of the Great Plains Correctional Institution, opened in 1991 as the state's first private prison, and holding non-U.S. citizen federal inmates as of 2016.

Casinos
Sugar Creek Casino is located just off I-40 in Hinton. The casino is an enterprise of the Wichita and affiliated tribes.
Casino Oklahoma is located just off I-40 on the east side of U.S. 281 and Hinton Boulevard, and is an enterprise of the Delaware Nation.

References

External links
 Town of Hinton official website
 Encyclopedia of Oklahoma History and Culture - Hinton
 Sugar Creek Casino

Towns in Caddo County, Oklahoma
Towns in Oklahoma